1597 Laugier, provisional designation , is an asteroid from the outer region of the asteroid belt, approximately 20 kilometers in diameter. It was discovered on 7 March 1949, by French astronomer Louis Boyer at the north African Algiers Observatory in Algeria. It was later named after French astronomer Marguerite Laugier.

Orbit and classification 

This asteroid orbits the Sun in the outer main-belt at a distance of 2.6–3.1 AU once every 4 years and 10 months (1,752 days). Its orbit has an eccentricity of 0.09 and an inclination of 12° with respect to the ecliptic. As no precoveries were taken and no prior identifications were made, Laugiers observation arc begins with its official discovery observation in 1949.

Physical characteristics 

Laugier is a presumed C-type asteroid

Lightcurves 

A rotational lightcurve for this asteroid from an unpublished source at the Asteroid Light Curve Database gave a well-defined rotation period of 8.020 hours with a brightness amplitude between 0.68 and 0.71 in magnitude. A similar period of 8.023 hours was previously obtained from remodeled data of the Lowell photometric database in March 2016.

Diameter and albedo 

According to the survey carried out by NASA's Wide-field Infrared Survey Explorer with its subsequent NEOWISE mission, Laugier measures 12.9 kilometers in diameter and its surface has an albedo of 0.244, while the Collaborative Asteroid Lightcurve Link assumes a standard albedo for carbonaceous asteroids of 0.057, and calculates a diameter of 24.3 kilometers based on an absolute magnitude of 11.8.

Naming 

This minor planet was named after French astronomer and asteroid discoverer Marguerite Laugier (1896–1976). The official  was published by the Minor Planet Center on 1 August 1978.

References

External links 
 Asteroid Lightcurve Database (LCDB), query form (info )
 Dictionary of Minor Planet Names, Google books
 Asteroids and comets rotation curves, CdR – Observatoire de Genève, Raoul Behrend
 Discovery Circumstances: Numbered Minor Planets (1)-(5000) – Minor Planet Center
 
 

001597
Discoveries by Louis Boyer (astronomer)
Named minor planets
19490307